Robert Gatling Simmons (born July 7, 1954) is a former American football guard in the National Football League (NFL). He was drafted by the New Orleans Saints in the third round of the 1976 NFL Draft. He played college football at Texas.

Simmons also played for the Kansas City Chiefs and the Chicago Blitz of the United States Football League.

References

1954 births
Living people
All-American college football players
American football offensive guards
American football offensive tackles
Kansas City Chiefs players
People from Temple, Texas
Players of American football from Texas
Texas Longhorns football players